Robert T. Janecyk (born May 18, 1957 in Chicago, Illinois) is a retired American professional ice hockey goaltender who played 110 games in the National Hockey League for the Los Angeles Kings and Chicago Blackhawks.

Janecyk attended Marist High School and played for Chicago State University in his hometown from 1976-78. He broke into pro hockey for the Fort Wayne Komets, then played in the American Hockey League for the New Brunswick Hawks, going 11-2 in the 1982 playoffs as the team captured the AHL's Calder Cup.

Janecyk finally got a chance to be the NHL Blackhawks' goaltender in the 1983-84 season, appearing in eight games. A blockbuster trade on the day of the 1984 NHL entry draft sent Chicago's first, third and fourth-round selections plus Janecyk to the Los Angeles Kings for their first and fourth-round picks. It ended up with one Chicago native leaving town but another arriving, the Blackhawks using the new first-round pick to draft Ed Olczyk. They were several years apart in age, but Janecyk and Olczyk had both often trained at the same local rink in their youth, and their high schools, Marist and Brother Rice, were arch rivals.

Also noteworthy from that deal, the Kings and new general manager Rogie Vachon used their fourth-round pick from Chicago to draft a future Hall of Famer, but one from a different sport, baseball pitcher Tom Glavine. Their first-round pick Craig Redmond had limited success and Glavine chose not to play hockey, but in the ninth round of that draft, the Kings did actually land a future Hall of Famer of hockey, Luc Robitaille.

Janecyk received more playing time out of the change of teams. He started in goal 89 times for Los Angeles the next two seasons, plus three games of the 1984-85 NHL playoffs. Two of those games went to overtime, but Janecyk and the Kings ended up eliminated by Wayne Gretzky and the Edmonton Oilers, who went on to win the Stanley Cup. Gretzky would be acquired by the Kings in August 1988, but by then Janecyk's career was almost over. He retired in 1989.

Janecyk's son Adam Janecyk was a goalie for the University of Michigan's hockey team from 2010-14.

References

1957 births
American men's ice hockey goaltenders
American people of Slavic descent
Chicago Blackhawks players
Ice hockey people from Chicago
Living people
Los Angeles Kings players
Ottawa Senators scouts
Undrafted National Hockey League players